Nicolas Alfonsi (13 April 1936 – 16 March 2020) was a French politician, member of the Senate of France, representing the department of Corse-du-Sud.

Biography
He was born in Cargèse, Corsica. He was a member of the Radical Party of the Left, and was by profession a lawyer. Alfonsi died on 16 March 2020, of COVID-19.

Honor
  Knight of Legion of Honour (2015)

References

External links
Page on the Senate website

1936 births
2020 deaths
People from Corse-du-Sud
Radical Party of the Left politicians
Deputies of the 5th National Assembly of the French Fifth Republic
Deputies of the 7th National Assembly of the French Fifth Republic
Deputies of the 8th National Assembly of the French Fifth Republic
French Senators of the Fifth Republic
Senators of Corse-du-Sud
Mayors of places in Corsica
Chevaliers of the Légion d'honneur
Deaths from the COVID-19 pandemic in France